Cornerstone Christian Academy may refer to: 

Cornerstone Christian Academy (Bloomington, Illinois)
Cornerstone Christian Academy (Ohio)